Raiano (locally Raianë) is a town and comune of the province of L'Aquila in the Abruzzo region of Italy.

Geography
In his Naturalis Historia, Pliny the Elder subdivided the Peligna region and its people into three categories: Paelignorum Corfinienses, Superequani et Sulmonenses. Raiano lies in the Corfinienses region on the south side of the Aterno river valley, only  from the remains of the ancient city of Corfinium.

History
The Villa Ragiani, or Castrum Radiani, was raised on the hill of Castellone in the Middle Ages, with the earliest references appearing in 872. This little village, that in the 10th century hosted for a short time emperors Otto I and Otto III, was ruled throughout the Middle Ages by the feudal events of the surrounding area and the Kingdom of Sicily, subject to the successive reigns of the Normans, the Hohenstaufen, the Angevins, and the Aragonese.

It maintained a notable importance, however, thanks to the barracks in the north-western Peligna Valley and its strategic position along the old Celano-Foggia Path and the ancient Via Tiburtina Valeria. The old town was deserted in the second half of the 15th century, after many earthquakes.

Main sights
 Hermitage of Saint Venantius
 Raiano baths Spa

Transport 
Raiano is served by the Raiano railway station, on the Terni–Sulmona railway, with trains to L'Aquila and Sulmona.

Notes and references

 
Spa towns in Italy